Bar Mills is an unincorporated village in the town of Buxton, York County, Maine, United States. The community is located along the Saco River at the junction of state routes 4A and 112. Bar Mills has a post office with ZIP code 04004.

References

Villages in York County, Maine
Buxton, Maine